Sorcerer's Apprentice is a travel book by Anglo-Afghan author, Tahir Shah.

Synopsis
The book is Shah's account of his travels throughout India and his meeting with godmen, sadhus, and street sorcerers. He had embarked on the trip to locate an Indian Illusionist who he had met as a boy in rural England and from whom he had learned magic tricks. The illusionist had been assigned as a guardian to Shah's great-grandfather's tomb. On his trip, he met a variety of such characters, many of whom run confidence tricks and had ingenious scams.

Reviews
 Review of Sorcerer's Apprentice and other Shah books on Mondo Ernesto
 Review from April 15, 2001 on Kirkus Reviews 
 Review of Sorcerer's Apprentice
 Review of Sorcerer's Apprentice on All About India
 Review of Sorcerer's Apprentice on Publishers Weekly

References

External links
 Sorcerer's Apprentice on Author Website

1998 non-fiction books
British travel books
Indian folklore
Magic books
Books by Tahir Shah
Weidenfeld & Nicolson books
English non-fiction books
Books about India